The Dragon Society or Society of Dragons is a secret society of senior men at Dartmouth College in Hanover, New Hampshire, United States. The group's membership and organizational structure are unknown, with notable exceptions. Dragon has been in continuous operation since its founding in 1898.

Activities
Because it is a secret society, little verifiable information is available about its activities.

Selection and traditions
Membership consists of a small number of senior men who are selected during their junior year in a school-wide selection process known as "tapping."   Every winter and spring, juniors are tapped for the senior societies through a process semi-coordinated through the College. Members are thought to be leaders of Dartmouth's athletic teams and fraternities.  Taps are voted on by the membership.

Members do not carry identifying canes at commencement, nor do they identify themselves in Dartmouth's yearbook, The Aegis.  Members of Dartmouth's other secret societies identify themselves in either or both ways.

Dragons
Despite the secrecy that surrounds the society, the Dartmouth Board of Trustees website lists Trustee Jeff Immelt, the former CEO of General Electric, as a member. Paul Killibrew continued to list his membership in Dragon as of August 2015 on his LinkedIn page Digger Donahue's membership in Dragon was revealed by the alumni news when he won his 2014-2015 Dartmouth Alumni Award for his extensive service to Dartmouth as an alumni volunteer.

See also
 Dartmouth College student groups
 Collegiate secret societies in North America

References

External links
The Dartmouth (newspaper) January 31, 1997
Halls Tombs and Houses: Student Society Architecture at Dartmouth
"General Electric CEO Made Rapid Rise," The Harvard Crimson (newspaper), June 8, 2005
"Covered Undercover," The Dartmouth Independent (newspaper), September 19, 2005

Dartmouth College undergraduate societies
Collegiate secret societies
Student societies in the United States
Student organizations established in 1898
1898 establishments in New Hampshire